Sean Holly is an economist currently working at the University of Cambridge (1995–present). He previously held a Professorship at the University of Sheffield.  He is the Dean of Fitzwilliam College

He has written the book 'Optimal Control, Expectations and Uncertainty'.

References

Year of birth missing (living people)
Living people
Alumni of the University of Reading
English economists
Academics of the University of Sheffield
Fellows of Fitzwilliam College, Cambridge